Odedra is an Indian (Gujarati) surname. Notable people with the surname include:
 Jay Odedra (born 1989), Omani cricketer
 Jayesh Odedra (born 1987), Indian cricketer
 Nilesh Odedra (born 1973), Indian cricketer
 Sonia Odedra (born 1988), English cricketer
 Yuvraj Odedra (born 1997), English cricketer

See also 
 Odedara

Surnames of Indian origin
Indian surnames
Gujarati-language surnames
Hindu surnames